Holcosus gaigeae, also known commonly as the rainbow ameiva is a species of lizard in the family Teiidae. The species is endemic to Mexico.

References

gaigeae
Reptiles of North America
Reptiles described in 1946